Dewey Soper Migratory Bird Sanctuary, or Dewey Soper, is a migratory bird sanctuary in the Qikiqtaaluk Region, Nunavut, Canada.  It is located in western Baffin Island, from Bowman Bay to the Koukdjuak River, and is named in honour of zoologist J. Dewey Soper. It is an  area that was classified a wetland of international importance via the Ramsar Convention on May 24, 1982. The bird sanctuary supports nearly 30% of the breeding geese in Canada, making it the largest goose colony in the world. Up to two million birds of various species use the area for summer nesting, and it is also "habitat for one of Canada's major barren-ground caribou herds". The sanctuary was established in 1957, and is subject to the Nunavut Land Claims Agreement, which defines and governs ownership, land use and hunting rights in the area .

It is an intertidal zone on a broad coastal plain with raised, slightly sloping beaches, spotted with circular shallow lakes and a marsh plain.

See also
List of birds of Nunavut
List of Migratory Bird Sanctuaries of Canada#Nunavut
List of protected areas of Nunavut

References

External links
 Description of Dewey Soper Migratory Bird Sanctuary at wetlands.org
 Ramsar information sheet on Dewey Soper Migratory Bird Sanctuary

Ramsar sites in Qikiqtaaluk Region
Bird sanctuaries of Qikiqtaaluk Region
Baffin Island
Migratory Bird Sanctuaries of Canada